Belgorod International Airport  is an airport in Russia located 4 km north of Belgorod. It services narrow-body airliners (such as the Tupolev Tu-154, Tupolev Tu-204, Ilyushin Il-76, Boeing 737, Airbus A320, Boeing 757 etc.) and wide-body airliner Boeing 767. It conducts 24-hour flight operations. The airport was founded in 1954.

History
The establishment date of the airport is considered to be 30 August 1954, when the order was issued by the Deputy Chief of Air Fleet under the Council of Ministers of the USSR and Belgorod landing pad began its transformation into a class IV Airport.

In 1954, the Kursk squadron relocated to the northern outskirts of Belgorod. These aircraft carried cargo and mail transportation, medical staff in the newly created districts of the Belgorod Oblast. The staff (technicians, drivers) did not exceed 20-30 people then.

In 1957, Yak-12 came into operation, capable of carrying 4 passengers or 350 kilograms of cargo. Aircraft used for flight on the territory of the region. In the years 1959–1968, made fleet capacity by AN-2 and Yak-12.

In 1969, the runway was put into operation. It began receiving short-haul aircraft: Yak-40, L-410, An-24. To fly to Moscow, Sochi, Anapa, Simferopol, Poltava, Donetsk. Created by air traffic control, 170 people work at the plant. Since 1970, flights operated to Rostov-on-Don, Voronezh, Krasnodar and Lipetsk.

In 1975, the airport admitted to reception of the Tu-134. New lines opened up to new directions in Murmansk, Yekaterinburg, Astrakhan, Tyumen, Smolensk, Saratov and Mariupol.

In 1976–1989, years of the expansion of the geography of flights and an increase in the intensity of flights. 1981 saw the reconstruction of the runway. In the years 1985–1994 passenger flights were performed to Khabarovsk, Novosibirsk, Surgut, Tyumen, Murmansk, Arkhangelsk, Leningrad, Riga, Minsk, Kiev, Lviv, Yerevan, Sochi, Odessa, Simferopol, Kaliningrad, Chelyabinsk and Baku.

In 1995, the airport was given the status of international airport. Along with the implementation of domestic flights, international flights started to operate to Turkey, Bulgaria, Israel, Hungary. Accepted cargo planes from India, China, the Netherlands, the United Arab Emirates.

In 1998–1999 following an economic meltdown, which resulted in a sharp decline in demand for passenger air travel and the reduction of the amount of work, number of flights reduced.

In 2000–2001, scheduled passenger transport resumed, including international with opening of new flights to Salekhard, Tyumen, Surgut, Norilsk, Yekaterinburg, Anapa, Murmansk, Sochi, Novy Urengoy, Soviet, Naryan-Mar, Arkhangelsk, Israel, Hungary, Cyprus and Bulgaria using Tu-134, Tu-154, Yak- 42, with a capacity of 70–160 passengers.

In April 2002, "the airline Belgorod" transformed into a Federal State Unitary Enterprise "Belgorod State Aviation Enterprise", and in December of the same year transformed into Open Joint Stock Company "Belgorod Airlines".

In February 2022, all civilian air traffic was indefinitely suspended in connection with the 2022 Russian invasion of Ukraine.

Airlines and destinations

Traffic statistics

See also
List of the busiest airports in Russia
List of the busiest airports in Europe
List of the busiest airports in the former USSR
Belgorod Air Enterprise

References

External links

 Belgorod International Airport
 NOAA/NWS current weather observations
 ASN Accident history for UUOB

Airports built in the Soviet Union
Airports in Belgorod Oblast
Belgorod